Anthony John Sarrero (born September 20, 1949), also known by his stage name Anthony Denison (also credited as Anthony John Denison and Tony Denison), is an American actor.

Early life
The eldest of three, he was born and raised in Harlem. He worked for John Hancock Insurance as a life insurance agent in Poughkeepsie, New York, while pursuing his acting career, starring in several stage productions around New Paltz, New York. His stage surname "Denison" was taken from his friend Jan Denison during his days as an actor and director at a nonprofit theater in the late 1970s.

Career
Denison is most recently known for his role as Lieutenant Andy Flynn in The Closer (2005–2012) and its spin-off Major Crimes (2012–2018). He is well known for his role as mob boss Ray Luca on the NBC crime drama Crime Story (1986–1988). Afterwards, he starred and guest-starred in several crime movies and television programs, notably as undercover agent John Henry Raglin in Wiseguy (1987–90), The Great Escape II: The Untold Story (1988), City of Hope (1991), as Joey Buttafuoco in The Amy Fisher Story (1993), as John Gotti in Getting Gotti (1994), Criminal Passion (1994), and as head coach Mike George in ESPN's drama series Playmakers (2003). He appeared in Season 1, Episode 3, of Charmed (1998-2006) as the father of the Halliwell sisters. In 2005, he appeared on Criminal Minds as Sgt. Weigart, a role he reprised in 2020 for one episode. He played Detective Buroughs in Karla (2006). He had a recurring role as Aldo Burrows on the Fox series Prison Break (2005–2009). In 2000, he played the role of a killer for hire in Walker, Texas Ranger (1993–2001). Denison embodied "Government Investor" in the 2011 Frankie Muniz superhero film Pizza Man. Denison played "The General" in the VR movie Agent Emerson.

Filmography

Film

Television

References

External links 
 

1949 births
Living people
People from Harlem
American male television actors
American male film actors
State University of New York at New Paltz alumni
Male actors from New York City
20th-century American male actors
21st-century American male actors